Red Devil Vampire Crabs are decapod crustaceans part of Brachyura (from the Greek βραχύς = short, οὐρά = tail/abdomen). 

They are land living, freshwater crabs from tropical areas and are endemic to Indonesia. Like all other crabs, they have a carapace, two chelae and ten jointed legs. They are omnivores

The species is named after the Rolf C. Hagen Group, which supported work by Christian Lukhaup and Christoph D. Schubart, two of the authors of the describing article. G. hagen is often found in the aquarium trade and it is relatively inexpensive.

The catchy common name was given as a marketing move in order to attract more attention to the crab from buyers and keepers. This is a shared characteristic of all Geosesarma crabs

Environment 
Geosesarma hagen is a species of small land-living crabs only found in Java, Indonesia. The crabs prefer a humid environment with elements from both terrestrial and freshwater aquatic habitats. They steer clear of drier land and although the younger crabs tend to live in closer proximity to the water, they are not aquatic crabs. Young Red Devil crabs spend most of their time in the water as a way to avoid predators.

They are used to living in warm humid conditions and their preferred temperature ranges from 24-28 degrees Celsius (75-82 F).

There are many species of Geosesarma crabs living in the same natural habitat in Java, and they can all be easily identified by their bright and unusual colors. They are all known as Vampire Crabs

Morphology 
They can reach up to 7 cm (3 in) in length counting the full leg span. Amongst their distinguishing features, G. hagen has a wider, square shape body, dark brown anterior carapace and legs, while the posterior of the carapace and the claws/chelae are instead orange/red. Their abdomen is usually gray and they have bright yellow eyes.

Reproduction and Life Cycle 
G. hagen can live up to 2 years, but they average about 1.5 years. They undergo molting in order to grow and recover lost legs and limbs within a few months of losing them. They can go through several molts during their lifetime.

The Red Devil Vampire crabs are sexually dimorphic and males have a narrow and slimmer plate while females have a broad plate on their belly and they might also be carrying around some fertilized eggs. Another difference between male and female crabs is in their claws: males have larger and brighter claws while females have smaller claws.

Mating occurs when the female is ready to mate and it lasts for several minutes. The females release their eggs in freshwater and each female can carry about 12-24 eggs. Incubation lasts around 30–50 days and the larval stage is completely absent. The hatched crab develops directly and they lack coloration when they are young (they are dark brown).

Behavior 
Red Devil Crabs are nocturnal and spend most of their life hidden from the light in order to avoid predation. At night, they become active hunters and scavengers. They are very social crabs and get along with other members of their species. Like with many crabs, G. hagen shows higher social and behavioral complexity than most invertebrates. They are however often aggressive with crabs of other species, including other Geosesarma species.

They often create their shelters by digging up small amounts of dirt near bodies of water. Though they are not generally thought of as true burrowers, they spend most of their time hidden in these dens.

Ecology 
The Red Devils are omnivores (though they show a preference for carnivorous prey), and their diet ranges from small detritus and dead plants to fruit flies, woodlice and other bugs.

They also are key animals in the microbial loop in the tropics as well as key players for biogeochemical nutrient cycling. (Lidquist et al. 2009)

Relationship with Humans 
It is popular in the aquarium trade, where it is sometimes called "Geosesarma red devil" or "Geosesarma sp "rot" (rot means "red" in German). All species of Geosesarma crabs are often called "vampire crabs" in the aquarium trade.

The crabs are not known to pose any danger to humans, though their bright coloration would suggest otherwise at a first glance.

References 
3. Michael. (2022, February 18). Red Devil Crab – Detailed Guide: Care, Diet, and breeding. Shrimp and Snail Breeder. Retrieved April 7, 2022, from https://aquariumbreeder.com/red-devil-crab-detailed-guide-care/

4. Freitag, H., Manuel-Santos, M., & Ng, P. K. L. (1892). Two new species of Geosesarma de Man, 1892 (crustacea: Brachyura: Sesarmidae) from Palawan, the Philippines. Archīum Ateneo. Retrieved April 12, 2022, from https://archium.ateneo.edu/biology-faculty-pubs/8/

5. Lindquist, E. S., et al. (2009). Land Crabs as key drivers in ... - Wiley Online Library. Retrieved from https://onlinelibrary.wiley.com/doi/full/10.1111/j.1469-185X.2008.00070.x

6. Burggren, W., & McMahon, B. R. (2009). Biology of the land crabs. Cambridge University Press.

7. Ng, Peter K. L.; Wowor, Daisy (2019). The vampire crabs of Java, with descriptions of five new species from Mount Halimun Salak National Park, West Java, Indonesia (Crustacea: Brachyura: Sesarmidae: Geosesarma). https://web.p.ebscohost.com/abstract?site=ehost&scope=site&jrnl=02172445&AN=140243800&h=IzfZIqXBjIe1tn4LM%2brOJNoz6ywTBYFug362mxESHsvblTfmmb4aYlSch3cnPIAPL9gEJ692HYuqQ%2bOwJqCdvQ%3d%3d&crl=c&resultLocal=ErrCrlNoResults&resultNs=Ehost&crlhashurl=login.aspx%3fdirect%3dtrue%26profile%3dehost%26scope%3dsite%26authtype%3dcrawler%26jrnl%3d02172445%26AN%3d140243800

8. Yeo, D. C. J., Ng, P. K. L., Cumberlidge, N., Magalhães, C., Daniels, S. R., & Campos, M. R. (1970, January 1). Global diversity of crabs (crustacea: Decapoda: Brachyura) in freshwater. SpringerLink. Retrieved April 25, 2022, from https://link.springer.com/chapter/10.1007/978-1-4020-8259-7_30

External links

New species of “vampire crabs” (Geosesarma De Man, 1892) from central Java, Indonesia, and the identity of Sesarma (Geosesarma) nodulifera De Man, 1892 (Crustacea, Brachyura, Thoracotremata, Sesarmidae)
Geosesarma crabs mating - Video of G. hagen crabs mating

Grapsoidea
Freshwater crustaceans of Asia
Crustaceans described in 2015